Tandrang may refer to:

Tandrang, Gorkha, Nepal
Tandrang, Lamjung, Nepal